Kendriya Vidyalaya Pt. Deen Dayal Upadhyay Nagar is a co-educational school located in the town of Pt. Deen Dayal Upadhyaya Nagar. The school is affiliated to CBSE and has classes running from 1 to 12.

Academic Activities
The school conducts various activities in the following :

Scout & Guide 
Objectives :
To contribute to the education of young people through a value system based on the
Scout/Guide promise and law to built a better world where people are self-fulfilled as
individuals and play a constructive role in society.
Activity in Vidyalaya :
 Pravesh investiture held in the month of July/August.
 Pratham sopan testing is completed/performed in the month of August / September.
 Dwitiya sopan testing is performed/ held in the month of September/October.
These testing camps are organized as per KVS R/O and H/Q orders/letters.
 Tritiya sopan
 Rajya Puraskar
 President Puraskar/Award
During the session, different activities are conducted in Vidyalaya as social work,
tracking, two-night camp, cleanliness drivers, knotting, camping, hike, tent-making
for 3–4 persons. Test for different Badges ( proficiency ) is conducted at Vidyalaya level.
Overall attention is given to make a truthful and honest citizen in the country.

Co-Curricular Activities (CCA) 
Every year, students participate in many activities like –
 English Calligraphy Competition
 English Poem Recitation
 Drawing Competition
 Solo/Group Song & Dance Competition
 Debate
 GK & GS Quiz

Sports 
Students grow their physical & mental fitness by playing sports and doing yoga respectively. 
Following games are provided for students during sports period –
 Football
 Volleyball
 Basketball
 Handball
Students participate in Sports Competitions at Regional level, get selected for National level and SGFI.

References

Pandit Deen Dayal Upadhyaya Nagar
Kendriya Vidyalayas in Uttar Pradesh
Educational institutions established in 1976
1976 establishments in Uttar Pradesh